Salaheldin Adel Ahmed Alhassan (born 3 April 1995) is a Sudanese professional footballer who plays as a midfielder for Al-Hilal Omdurman and the Sudan national football team.

References 
 

Living people
1995 births
Sudanese footballers
Sudan international footballers
Association football midfielders
Al-Hilal Club (Omdurman) players
Sudan A' international footballers
2022 African Nations Championship players